Parrawe is a rural locality in the local government areas (LGA) of Burnie and Waratah–Wynyard in the North-west and west LGA region of Tasmania. The 2016 census recorded a population of nil for the state suburb of Parrawe.

History 
Parrawe was gazetted as a locality in 1974. The name was used for a parish in 1904, and for the locality by 1929. It is believed to be an Aboriginal word for “abstain” or “cease”.

Geography
The Arthur River forms most of the western boundary. The Hellyer River, a tributary of the Arthur, forms the eastern boundary.

Road infrastructure 
Route A10 (Murchison Highway) runs through from north-east to south.

References

Towns in Tasmania
Burnie, Tasmania
Localities of Waratah–Wynyard Council